Bartolomeo Intieri (Florence, 1678 - Naples, 27 February 1757) was an Italian agronomist.

Life 
Born in Florence in 1678, Interi moved to Naples in 1699. He studied mathematics, focusing on the theories by René Descartes, Galileo Galilei and Giovanni Alfonso Borelli.  
He composed two operettas at San Marco dei Cavoti, near Benevento, dedicating them to G. Cavaniglia, marquis of St. Mark. Since his writings did not reach the hoped-for success, he turned to the erudite Florentine librarian Antonio Magliabechi who pledged to gain them greater visibility.

He was interested in mechanics, in particular to the application to the construction of useful agricultural machines for the milling of grain. In 1716 he published Nuova invenzione di fabbricar mulini a vento (about windmills) dedicating the work to Wirich Philipp von Daun.

In March 1734 he obtained the task of administering Medici's allodal goods, engaging simultaneously as a secret informant of the Tuscan government. The information he provided was about the over-travels, the clashes between the Roman Curia and Neapolitan, and popular issues regarding protests and adherence to the monarchy.

When in 1743 he was released from his office following the death of Anna Maria Luisa de' Medici, the last representative in Florence of the Medici family, he continued to earn 600 ducats. During these years he accumulated a considerable amount of money that allowed him to build a residence on the Sorrento hills, in Massaquano, where he held various cultural debates surrounded by close friends like Ferdinando Galiani and Antonio Genovesi.

Works

References 

1678 births
1757 deaths
Italian agronomists
18th-century Italian writers
18th-century Italian male writers
People from Florence